This is a list of women artists who were born in the Netherlands or whose artworks are closely associated with that country.

A
Marijke Abels (born 1948), sculptor
Anna Adelaïde Abrahams (1848–1930), still life painter
Annie Abrahams (born 1954), performance and video artist
Betzy Akersloot-Berg (1850–1922), Norwegian-born painter
Marie van Regteren Altena (1868–1958), painter
Lizzy Ansingh (1875–1959), painter
Thérèse Ansingh who used the pseudonym Sorella (1883–1968), painter
Henriëtte Asscher (1858–1933), painter

B
Sara van Baalbergen (1607–after 1638), Golden Age painter
Tine Baanders (1890–1971), illustrator, graphic designer, typographer, lithographer
Catharina Backer (1689–1766), painter
Maria Geertruida Barbiers (1801–1879), painter 
Marjolein Bastin (born 1943), children's writer, illustrator
Jo Bauer-Stumpff (1873–1964), painter
Hanneke Beaumont (born 1947), sculptor
Euphrosine Beernaert (1831–1901), landscape painter
Ans van den Berg  (1873–1942), painter 
Else Berg (1877–1942), Polish-born Dutch painter
Helen Berman (born 1936), painter
Jeanne Bieruma Oosting (1898–1994) sculptor, engraver, graphic artist, lithographer, illustrator, glass artist, painter, illustrator and book designer
Marie Bilders-van Bosse (1837–1900), landscape painter
Anke Birnie (born 1943), sculptor
Kate Bisschop-Swift (1834–1928), painter
Saskia Boddeke (born 1962), multimedia artist and theatre director
Nelly Bodenheim (1874–1951), illustrator
Frederika Henriëtte Broeksmit (1875–1945), painter, printmaker, peace activist
Margaretha Cornelia Boellaard (1795–1872), painter, lithographer
Manon de Boer (born 1966), video artist
Marike Bok (1943–2017), painter
Elisabeth Bol-Smit (1904–1987), painter 
Emilie Boon (fl. 1883–), children's writer and illustrator
Maaike Braat-Rolvink (1879–1959), painter
Hetty Broedelet-Henkes (1878–1949), painter 
Gesina ter Borch (1633–1690), Golden Age painter
Adriënne Broeckman-Klinkhamer (1876–1976), painter, illustrator, and textile artist
Hildegard Brom-Fischer (1908–2001), textile artist
Coosje van Bruggen (1942–2009), sculptor and art historian
Annie Bruin (1870–1961), painter

C
Mies Callenfels-Carsten (1893–1982), painter 
Christina Chalon (1748–1808), painter and etcher
Cornelia Cnoop (1449–1499), miniaturist
Mayken Coecke (c.1545–1578), painter
Els Coppens-van de Rijt (born 1943), painter, writer
Marie Cremers (1874–1960), painter, lithographer, graphic artist, illustrator
Susanna de La Croix (1756–1789), painter

D
Jenny Dalenoord (1918–2013), illustrator
Rachel van Dantzig (1878–1949), sculptor
Amie Dicke (born 1978), visual artist specializing in cut-outs from fashion magazines 
Emmy Dinkel-Keet (1908–2003), painter, illustrator
Sophie van der Does de Willebois (1891–1961), ceramist
Nelly van Doesburg (1899–1975), dancer, painter
Cécile Dreesmann (1920–1994), textile artist
Wilhelmina Drupsteen (1880–1966), illustrator
Marie Duchatel (1652–1692), painter
Debora Duyvis (1874–1960),illustrator, engraver
Lize Duyvis (1889–1964), painter

E
Stien Eelsingh (1903–1964), painter
Christina Maria Elliger (1731–1802), painter
Catharina Jacoba Abrahamina Enschedé (1828–1883), painter
Christina Gerarda Enschedé (1791–1873), painter
Titia Ex (born 1959) (fl. 2013–), conceptual artist
Johanna van Eybergen (1865–1950), applied artist and designer

F
Maria Margaretha la Fargue (1738–1793), painter
Maria Faydherbe (1587–1643), sculptor
Etha Fles (1857–1948), painter, printmaker, critic
Anna Folkema (1695–1768), engraver
Marianne Franken (1884–1945), painter
Aletta de Frey (1768–1808), painter

G
Lotti van der Gaag (1923–1999), sculptor, painter 
Hendrika van Gelder (1870–1943), painter 
Julia Giesberts (1893–1983), painter, printmaker
Agnieta Gijswijt (1873–1962), painter
Diana Glauber (1650–c.1721), Golden Age painter
Margaretha van Godewijk (1627–1677), Golden Age painter
Nelly Goedewaagen (1880–1953), painter
Marijke de Goey (born 1947), visual artist, sculptor
Sárika Goth (1880–1953), painter 
Dorothea Maria Graff (1678–1743), painter
Lina Gratama (1875–1946), painter 
Maria de Grebber (1602–1680), Golden Age painter
Aleida Greve (1670–1742), painter
Anita Groener (born 1958), painter and illustrator
Mieke Groot (born 1949), glass artist
Greet Grottendieck (born 1943), sculptor

H
Adriana Johanna Haanen (1814–1895), painter
Elisabeth Alida Haanen (1809–1845), painter
Margaretha Haverman (c.1693–after 1739), flower painter
Jacoba van Heemskerck (1876–1923), painter, stained-glass artist
Margaretha de Heer (1603–1665), Golden Age painter
P. van Heerdt tot Eversberg-Quarles van Ufford (1862–1939), feminist, artist, and peace activist
Jeanne van Heeswijk (born 1965), visual artist and curator
Annie van der Heide (1896–1968), sculptor
Marie Heijermans (1859–1937), painter 
Marie Heineken (1844–1930), painter
Catharina van Hemessen (1528–after 1587), painter
Alida Sophia Hendriks (1901–1984), painter
Milou Hermus (1947–2021), painter
Johanna Helena Herolt (1668–1723), German-born painter
Roeloffina van Heteren-Vink (1875–1971), painter
Geertruida van Hettinga Tromp (1872–1962), painter
Jemmy van Hoboken (1900–1962), painter
Anna Cornelia Holt (1671–1692), painter
Louise van Holthe tot Echten (1892–1981), painter
Sophia Holt (1658–1734), painter
Tine Honig (1894–1957), painter
Maria Ida Adriana Hoogendijk (1874–1942), painter
Ina Hooft (1894–1994), painter
Berthe Hoola van Nooten (1817–1892), botanical illustrator
Antonina Houbraken (1686–1736), draughtswoman
Christina Houbraken (1695–1760s), painter
Alida van Houten (1868–1960), painter 
Barbara Elisabeth van Houten (1863–1950), painter
Antoinette van Hoytema (1875–1967), painter
Bramine Hubrecht (1855–1913), painter, etcher and illustrator
Henriette Hubregtse-Lanzing (1879–1959), painter, etcher
Arina Hugenholtz (1848–1934), painter
Cornelia Aletta van Hulst (1797–1870), painter
Frieda Hunziker (1908–1966), painter
Francina Margaretha van Huysum (1707–1789), flower painter

I
Wilhelmina van Idsinga (1788–1819), painter
Lucie van Dam van Isselt (1871–1949), flower painter
Olga van Iterson-Knoepfle (1879–1961), painter

J
Adrienne van Hogendorp-s' Jacob (1857–1920), still life painter
Mirjam Jacobson (1887–1945), painter
Marie de Jonge (1872–1951), painter
Claudy Jongstra (born 1963), artist and textile designer

K
Dorry Kahn-Weyl (1896–1981), painter 
Henriette Agnete Kitty von Kaulbach (1900–1992), German-Dutch painter
Lucie Keijser (1875–1958), painter
Judy Michiels van Kessenich (1901–1972), painter 
Helena Klakocar (born 1958), cartoonist
Nel Klaassen (1906–1989), sculptor
Lorena Kloosterboer (born 1962), Dutch-Argentine painter and sculptor
Nel Kluitman (1879–1961), painter, sculptor 
Catharina van Knibbergen (1630–1675), Golden Age landscape painter
Henriëtte Geertruida Knip (1783–1842), flower painter
Rie Knipscheer (1911–2003), painter
Elise Thérèse Koekkoek-Daiwaille (1814–1881), painter, lithographer
Joanna Koerten (1650–1715), painter, embroiderer, glass etcher 
Elisabeth Johanna Koning (1816–1887), still life painter
Jo Koster (1868–1944), painter 
Gunhild Kristensen (1919–2002), stained glass artist
Jo Kruyder-Bouman (1886–1973), painter, illustrator
Andrea Kruis (born 1962), illustrator
Marina Kulik (born 1956), painter

L
Juliana Cornelia de Lannoy (1738–1782), artist and poet
Coba van der Lee (1893–1972), painter
Anna Lehmann (1876–1956), painter and etcher
Judith Leyster (1609–1660), Golden Age painter
Mechtelt van Lichtenberg (c.1520–1598), painter
Lou Loeber (1867–1952), painter
Ien Lucas (born 1955), artist
Ans Luttge-Deetman (1867–1952), painter

M
Tjaarke Maas (1974–2004), painter
Karin Mader (1910–1973), painter
Mien Marchant (1866–1952), painter
Henriëtte Marcus (1891–1993), painter
Grada Hermina Marius (1854–1919), writer and painter
Ans Markus (born 1947), painter
Cornelia van Marle (1661–1699), Golden Age painter
Eva van Marle (fl. 1640s–1650s), Golden Age painter
Alberta Johanna Meijer-Smetz (1893–1953), painter
Christien Meindertsma (born 1980), artist
Geesje Mesdag-van Calcar (1850–1936), painter
Sina Mesdag-van Houten (1834–1909), painter
Berhardina Midderigh-Bokhorst (1880–1972), illustrator
Kitty van der Mijll Dekker (1908–2004), textile artist 
Agatha van der Mijn (1700–1776/1796), flower painter
Cornelia van der Mijn (1709–1782), flower painter
Wally Moes (1856–1918), genre painter, writer
Ro Mogendorff (1907–1969), painter
Marie Molijn (1837–1932), painter
Phemia Molkenboer (1883–1940), ceramist
Maria Moninckx (1673–1757), botanical artist
Pauline Johanna Gesine Mouthaan(1892–?), painter
Charlotte Mutsaers (born 1942), painter, writer

N
Jacoba Maria van Nickelen (c.1690–1749), flower painter
Jacqueline Marguerite van Nie (1897–1983), painter 
Henriëtte Gesina Numans (1877–1955), painter

O
Yvonne Oerlemans (1945–2012), sculptor, installation artist
Willemina Ogterop (1881–1974), Dutch-American stained-glass artist
Saskia Olde Wolbers (born 1971), video artist
Wendelien van Oldenborgh (born 1962), installation artist, painter and video artist
Maria Jacoba Ommeganck (1760–1849), animal painter
Adri Bleuland van Oordt (1862–1944), painter and illustrator
Johanna Bleuland van Oordt (1865–1948), painter
Anuska Oosterhuis (born 1978), media artist
Suze Oosterhuis-van der Stok (1910–1989), ceramicist
Maria van Oosterwijck (1630–1693),Golden Age painter
Catharina Oostfries (1636–1708), Golden Age glass painter
Jeanne Bieruma Oosting (1898–1994), sculptor, engraver, illustrator and painter
Maria Margaretha van Os (1779–1862), flower painter
Hinke Osinga (born 1969), mathematician and mathematical artist

P
Corrie Pabst (1866–1943), painter 
Charlotte van Pallandt (1898–1997), painter, sculptor
Helena Christina van de Pavord Smits (1867–1941), botanical illustrator 
Magdalena van de Passe (1600–1638), engraver
Henriëtta van Pee (1692–1741), painter
Gertrude de Pélichy (1743–1825), painter
Henriëtte Pessers (1899–1986), painter
Adri Pieck (1894–1982), painter
Gretha Pieck (1898–1920), painter
Johanna Pieneman (1889–1986), painter
Magdalena Pietersz (before 1560–after 1592), painter
Charlotte Pothuis (1867–1945), painter
Alida Jantina Pott (1888–1931), painter
Augusta Preitinger (1878–1946), painter

R
Cecilia Maria Elisabeth de Ranitz (1880–1970), painter
Adriana van Ravenswaay (1816–1872), painter
Etie van Rees (1879–1959), ceramist
Adya van Rees-Dutilh (1876–1959), textile artist
Betsy Repelius (1848–1921), painter and watercolorist
Henriëtte Johanna Reuchlin-Lucardie (1877–1970), painter 
Cornelia de Rijck (1653–1726), bird painter 
Coba Ritsema (1876–1961), portrait painter
Suze Robertson (1855–1922), painter
Catharina Julia Roeters van Lennep (1813–1883), painter 
Geertruydt Roghman (1625–1657), Golden Age painter
Magdalena Roghman (1637–1679), Golder Age engraver
Henriëtte Ronner-Knip (1821–1909), animal painter
Margaretha Roosenboom (1843–1896), flower painter
Katharina Rozee (1632–1682), Golden Age embroiderer
Aletta Ruijsch (1860–1930), painter 
Anna Ruysch (1666–1741), Golden Age flower painter
Rachel Ruysch (1664–1750), still life painter

S
Sara Saftleven (1645–1702), Golden Age flower painter
Gerardina Jacoba van de Sande Bakhuyzen (1826–1895), painter
Riek Schagen (1913–2008), actress, painter
Maria Schalcken (1645–1699),  Golden Age painter
Cornelia Scheffer (1769–1839), miniaturist portrait painter
Elisabeth Barbara Schmetterling (1801–1882), printmaker, illustrator and miniaturist
Lara Schnitger (born 1969), Dutch-American sculptor and painter
Maaike Schoorel (born 1973), painter
Lique Schoot (born 1969), visual artist
Lizzy Schouten (1887–1967), painter
Lydia Schouten (born 1948), performance and video artist
Anna Maria van Schurman (1607–1678), engraver, painter, writer
Georgine Schwartze (1854–1935), sculptor
Thérèse Schwartze (1851–1918), portrait painter
Bertha thoe Schwartzenberg (1891–1993), sculptor
Maria Adeline Alice Schweistal or Fanny Psicha (1864–1950), Belgium born Dutch painter
Suze Slager-Velsen (1883–1964), painter
Maria Geertruida Snabilie (1776–1838), painter
Ellen Spijkstra (born 1957), ceramic artist
Adriana Spilberg (1652–1700), Dutch Golden Age painter 
Pietertje van Splunter (born 1968), painter
Susanna van Steenwijk (1601–1664), architectural painter
Hilda van Stockum (1908–2006), children's writer, painter and illustrator
Agnes van Stolk (1898–1980), painter 
Pauline Suij (1863–1949), painter
Jacoba Surie (1879–1970), painter
Maria Machteld van Sypesteyn (1724–1774), painter

T
Thamine Tadama-Groeneveld, (1871–1938), painter
Levina Teerlinc (1510–1576), miniaturist
Judith Ten Bosch (born 1957), painter and illustrator
Maria Tesselschade Visscher (1594–1649), poet and engraver
Maria Theresia van Thielen (1640–1706), painter
Moniek Toebosch (1948–2012), installation artist
Bartha Hermina Tollius (1780–1847), amateur pastellist
Elisabeth Tonnard (born 1973), artist and poet
Charley Toorop (1891–1955), painter, lithographer
Marit Törnqvist (born 1964), Swedish-Dutch illustrator
Sara Troost (1732–1803), painter

V
Bertha Valkenburg (1862–1929), painter
Apollonia van Veen (died 1635), pastellist
Julie van der Veen (1903–1997), painter, engraver and illustrator
Margaretha C. Verheus (1905–1990), painter
Mayken Verhulst (1518–1599), miniature, tempera and watercolor painter
Sophie Verrijn Stuart (1890–1946) ceramicist
Philipine Vinke (born 1968), artist
Anna Visscher (1584–1651), artist, poet and translator
Barbara Visser (born 1966), contemporary artist
Tula Marina di Vista (1888–1969), artist and writer 
Tilly Münninghoff-van Vliet (1879–1960), painter
Maria Vos (1824–1906), still-life painter
Madelon Vriesendorp (born 1945), painter

W
Marie Wandscheer (1856–1936), painter 
Marie van Waning-Stevels (1874–1943), painter 
Elisabeth Geertruida Wassenbergh (1729–1781), painter
Catharina Elisabeth Wassink (1879–1960), painter 
Gisèle d'Ailly van Waterschoot van der Gracht (1912–2013), painter
Saskia Weishut-Snapper (born 1938), fiber artist
Maria Weenix (1697–1774), painter
Clara Adriana van der Werff (1895–1962), painter 
Maria de Wilde (1682–1729), playwright and engraver
Marie Willeboordse (1902–1989), painter 
Victoire Wirix (1875–1938), painter
Alida Withoos (c.1661–1730), botanical artist
Maria Withoos (1663–after 1699),  Golden Age painter
Petronella van Woensel (1785–1839), painter
Aleijda Wolfsen (1648–1692), Golden Age painter
Ans Wortel (1929–1996), painter, poet and writer
Elsa Woutersen-van Doesburgh (1875–1957), painter
Margaretha Wulfraet (1678–1760), painter
Gonda Wulfse (1896–1979), painter
Marie Wuytiers (1865–1944), painter
Geertgen Wyntges (1636–1712),flower painter

Y
Hannah Yakin (born 1933), Dutch-Israeli artist and writer
Catharina Ykens (1659–1737), Flemish still life painter

Z
Agatha Zethraeus (1872–1966), painter

See also
List of Dutch women photographers

-
Dutch women artists, List of
Artists
Artists